Justice Zimmerman may refer to:

Michael Zimmerman (jurist) (born 1943), chief justice of the Utah Supreme Court
Charles B. Zimmerman (1891–1969), associate justice of the Ohio Supreme Court